Hima Tharaka (Snowy Stars) is a 2017 Sri Lankan Sinhala drama film directed by Rodney Vidanapathirana and produced by Kanthi Alahakone for RW Productions. It stars Jagath Chamila and Nadee Chandrasekara in lead roles along with Amarasiri Kalansuriya and Maureen Charuni. The film was shot around the city Moronthuduwa, Bandaragama. It is the 1280th Sri Lankan film in the Sinhala cinema.

In July 2020, the film was re-screened in Ananda film theater, Gampola.

Plot

Cast
 Jagath Chamila
 Nadee Chandrasekara
 Amarasiri Kalansuriya
 Wimal Alahakoon
 Maureen Charuni
 Wasanthi Gunarathna
 Miyuri Samarasinghe
 Manel Wanaguru

Song

References

2017 films
2010s Sinhala-language films